Welinton may refer to:

 Welinton (footballer, born 1989), full name Welinton Souza Silva, Brazilian football centre-back
 Welinton Júnior (born 1993), full name Welinton Júnior Ferreira dos Santos, Brazilian football forward
 Welinton (footballer, born 1999), full name Welinton Macedo dos Santos, Brazilian football striker

See also
Wellington (disambiguation)